Mossman Peninsula is a narrow peninsula  long, extending south from the western part of Laurie Island and separating Scotia Bay and Wilton Bay, in the South Orkney Islands of Antarctica. Point Martin lies on the eastern side of the peninsula. It was discovered in 1821 by Captains George Powell and Nathaniel Palmer, and roughly charted on Powell's map of 1822. It was surveyed in 1903 by the Scottish National Antarctic Expedition under William Speirs Bruce, who named it for Robert C. Mossman, the meteorologist of the expedition.

References

Laurie Island
Peninsulas of the South Orkney Islands